Alipurduar University is a public university which was established by an Act of the West Bengal government notified on 2018. It is a newly established affiliating university in the Alipurduar, West Bengal.

History
In 1947, India got independence but with a painful partition on the religious line. This partition led to the migration of a huge number of displaced people to the Dooars areas. Higher education for the children of these uprooted poverty-stricken people was of utmost necessity to change their fortune. In 1956 under the Refugee Rehabilitation and Development Programme of the Union Government, a local committee led by Late N. K. Mukherjee moved to the government for an establishment of undergraduate degree College at the Alipurduar town. G.B. Panth (union home minister of that time) also urged the Chief Minister of West Bengal Dr. Bidhan Chandra Roy for setting up a sponsored Degree College at Alipurduar. Finally, this institution was formally established in 1957 as an affiliating college of the University of Calcutta.When the University of North Bengal was established in 1962 at this part of the West Bengal, the affiliation of the college changed from the University of Calcutta to the University of North Bengal. In 2018, West Bengal state government announced the decision to upgrade the Alipurduar College as a full-fledged university. Finally, Alipurduar University was formally established by an Act of the West Bengal legislature. It became active with the appointment of the first vice-chancellor, Mahendra Nath Roy, in 2020.

Academics

University offers PG courses in English, History, Physics and Chemistry.

The University College offers undergraduate courses in various subjects in Arts, Commerce and Sciences.

Notable alumni
Soumen Roy

See also

References

External links
https://alipurduaruniversity.ac.in//
University Grants Commission
National Assessment and Accreditation Council

Universities and colleges in Alipurduar district
Universities and colleges in West Bengal
Educational institutions established in 2020
Alipurduar district
2020 establishments in West Bengal
Universities established in the 2020s